Nandipur High School, located in Nandipur, Jajpur, Odisha, India is one of the oldest schools in  Odisha and was established in 1955. It is located in Dasarathpur block of Jajpur district of odisha.

References

Schools in Odisha
1955 establishments in Orissa
Educational institutions established in 1955